Trekking is a form of backpacking.

Trekking may also refer to:

Locomotion 
 Hiking, a long, vigorous walk
 Walking, a gait of locomotion among legged animals
 Horse or pony trekking, a form of trail riding

Other uses 
 Trekking (horse), a thoroughbred racehorse
 Trekking bike, a type of hybrid bicycle
 Trekking sarl, a French aircraft manufacturer
 Trekking during the Blitz, a term applied to the nightly movements of civilians from British cities threatened by air raids

See also 
 Trekking peak
 Trekking pole
 Trek (disambiguation)